Scafati Basket, known for sponsorship reasons as Givova Scafati, is an Italian professional basketball club based in Scafati, Campania. The club competes in the top level Italian professional basketball league, the Lega Basket Serie A (LBA).

History
Scafati Basket traces its history to Silvio Pellico, a club founded by a group of students in 1949. That merged with Savoia in 1955 to form Scafatese Basket, which would be renamed Centro Sportivo Scafatese in 1969. 
The team played in the amateur regional Serie C and Serie D until the early 1990s when, under the presidency of Aniello Longobardi, it climbed up divisions to reach the first tier Serie A in 2006.

It was relegated from the Serie A in 2007–08.

Arena
The team has played its home games in the PalaMangano (named after former head coach Massimo Mangano), it holds 3,700 seats.

Sponsorship names
Throughout the years, due to sponsorship, the club has been known as:
Rida Scafati (2001–2003)
Eurorida Scafati (2003–2006)
Legea Scafati (2006–2008)
Harem Scafati (2008–2009)
Bialetti Scafati (2009–2010)
Sunrise Scafati (2010–2011)
Givova Scafati (2011–present)

Players

Current roster

Notable players

  Greg Newton 2 seasons: '00–'02
  Randolph Childress 2 seasons: '01–'03
  Michael Campbell 1 season: '01–'02
  Curtis Staples 1 season: '01–'02
  Lamont Barnes 1 season: '02–'03
  Jason Smith 1 season: '02–'03
  Maximiliano Stanic 3 seasons: '03–'06
  James Collins 1 season: '03–'04
  Vincenzo Esposito 1 season: '03–'04
  Josh Powell 1 season: '03–'04
  Darryl Wilson 2 seasons: '04–'06
  Harold Jamison 2 seasons: '04–'06
  Jamal Robinson 1 season: '04–'05
  Rick Apodaca 1 season: '06–'07
  Hector Romero 1 season: '07–'08
  Michael Andersen 1 season: '07–'08
  Marcus Hatten 1 season: '07–'08
  Dimitri Lauwers 3 seasons: '05–'08
  Luigi Datome 2 seasons: '06–'08
  Frankie Williams 1 season: '07–'08
  Rubén Wolkowyski 1 season: '07–'08
  Steponas Babrauskas 1 season: '07–'08
  Mike Lenzly 1 season: '08–'09
  Anthony Carter 1 season: '06–'07

References

External links
Official Website 
Lega Nazionale Pallacanestro profile  Retrieved 24 August 2015
Serie A historical results  Retrieved 24 August 2015

1969 establishments in Italy
Basketball teams established in 1969
Basketball teams in Campania